Lleyton Hewitt and Mark Philippoussis were the defending champions, but Hewitt accepted a wildcard to compete in the men's doubles main draw instead. Philippoussis played alongside Tommy Haas, and successfully defended his title, defeating Colin Fleming and Xavier Malisse in the final, 7–6(7–4), 6–4.

Draw

Final

Group A

Group B

References
 Gentlemen's Invitation Doubles

Men's Invitation Doubles